Sann railway station is  located in  Pakistan.

See also
 Pakistan Railways

References

Railway stations in Pakistan
Railway stations on Kotri–Attock Railway Line (ML 2)